Vikalpa: The Journal for Decision Makers is the journal of the IIIM Ahmedabad. Launched in January 1976, this peer-reviewed journal is published quarterly by SAGE. Journal is indexed with SCOPUS, EBSCO and JGATE.

Abstracting and indexing
The Vikalpa: The Journal for Decision Makers is abstracted and indexed in:

 DeepDyve
 Dutch-KB
 EBSCO
 Indian Citation Index (ICI)
 SCOPUS
 J-Gate
 OCLC
 Ohio
 Portico
 ProQuest Central
 ProQuest: ABI/INFORM Collection
 ProQuest: ABI/INFORM Global
 ProQuest: Asian & European Business Collection
 ProQuest: India Database
 Proquest: Business Premium Collection
 UGC India

References 

 Gate
 IIMA-Vikalpa

External links 
 
 Homepage

SAGE Publishing academic journals
Publications established in 1976
Business and management journals